William Johnson McDonald (December 21, 1844 – February 8, 1926, though some sources give his date of death as February 6
) was a Paris, Texas banker who left $850,000 (the bulk of his fortune) to the University of Texas System to endow an astronomical observatory.

The bequest was unexpected, and his will was contested, but after prolonged legal disputes the university received the money. At the time, the university had no faculty of astronomy, so in 1932 it formed a collaboration with Otto Struve at the University of Chicago, who supplied astronomers.

The McDonald Observatory is named after him, with Otto Struve becoming the first director.

McDonald was the eldest of the three sons of Sarah Johnson and Henry Graham McDonald of Paris, Texas. As a young man, he was a private in the Confederate Army. He became wealthy through his businesses as a lawyer and a banker, but remained frugal his entire life. He never married and had no children.

References

External links
 
 Prater family tree - genealogy of William Johnson McDonald
 Photograph of William Johnson McDonald

1844 births
1926 deaths
People associated with astronomy
People from Paris, Texas
American bankers